Ice dance was contested during the figure skating events at the 2006 Winter Olympics.

This competition began with a compulsory dance, the Ravensburg Waltz, on February 17, in which all couples performed the same dance. The original dance, in which skaters performed to a designated set of rhythms (Latin combination), was held two days later, and the 4-minute free dance concluded the competition on February 20. 24 couples entered the competition, and all of them continued through to the free dance. Coming into the competition, Russians Tatiana Navka / Roman Kostomarov, the reigning world champions, were the clear favorites. Tanith Belbin / Benjamin Agosto, who won silver medals at the last World Championships, aimed to win the first Olympic medals in ice dance for USA since 1976. Teams from Ukraine, France, Canada, Israel, Lithuania, Italy, and Bulgaria were also vying for a medal.

Compulsory dance
There were a few surprises during the Compulsory Dance, which saw reigning world champions (undefeated this season) Navka / Kostomarov finishing second to the Italian team of Barbara Fusar-Poli / Maurizio Margaglio. The Italians, who were bronze medalists at the 2002 Winter Olympics in Salt Lake City, decided to make a comeback at these Olympic Games and had not competed at any international events since the last Games. They edged the Russians in the technical score and tied them in program components. Bulgaria's Albena Denkova / Maxim Staviski were another surprise finishing in third after the CD, followed by Canadians Marie-France Dubreuil / Patrice Lauzon. Reigning world bronze medalists, Ukrainians Elena Grushina / Ruslan Goncharov, finished in fifth. The biggest surprise was the sixth-place finish of Belbin / Agosto, who were originally seen as the main pair who could really challenge the Russian domination of Navka / Kostomarov. The French team of Isabelle Delobel / Olivier Schoenfelder follow, while another team making a comeback, Lithuanians Margarita Drobiazko / Povilas Vanagas, who finished third at the 2006 European Championships, sit in eighth. The Israeli team of Galit Chait / Sergei Sakhnovski found themselves in thirteenth after a fall during a step sequence. The Italian leaders and sixth placed Tanith Belbin / Ben Agosto were separated by just over a point, so the Americans could easily make up that difference.

Original dance
In the second portion of the dance competition, mistakes prevailed. Navka / Kostomarov did not seem to be affected by this and gave a solid performance to finish first in this portion and overall. Belbin / Agosto gave a crowd-pleasing performance which was placed second by the judges, putting them just over 1 point behind the Russians overall.

CD leaders Fusar-Poli / Margaglio had a very disappointing skate with Margaglio losing his balance causing both to fall. They finished tenth in the OD, keeping them well out of contention for a gold medal with Navka / Kostomarov almost 10 points ahead of them. At the end of the performance, Fusar-Poli gave her partner a withering glare and broke down in tears in the "kiss and cry" area just offstage. They were seventh overall heading into the free dance.

Grushina / Goncharov were good enough to finish third in the OD and overall, while Delobel / Schoenfelder were right behind. Despite troubles on their combination spin, Denkova / Staviski were able to land in the top five. Chait / Sakhnovski finished sixth in the OD and ninth overall, followed by Dubreuil / Lauzon who received a 2-point deduction for a painful fall that required Lauzon to carry his partner off the ice. Drobiazko / Vanagas also received deductions for a fall and for holding a lift for too long.

Free dance
Dubreuil / Lauzon announced they would withdraw from the free dance portion of the competition after Dubreuil's nasty fall on a rotational lift in the original dance, leaving them out of medal contention. Dubreuil had fallen on her right hip during the original dance, leaving her too badly injured to compete effectively.

Navka / Kostomarov were clearly in a class above their competition. Skating their passionate dance to Carmen, the Russian favorites received the highest technical and program components scores. Finishing behind them in the free dance and fourth overall were Delobel / Schoenfelder, with strong elements as well. Bronze medalists Grushina / Goncharov finished third in the free dance with a clean, yet slow skate. Belbin / Agosto captured the audience's attention with a powerful and exciting skate as they danced to flamenco music, but made tiny mistakes in their final twizzles and step sequence. This put them in fourth for the free dance but second overall. Their silver medal is the first for the Americans in 30 years. Fifth in the free and overall, Denkova / Staviski had strong technical content, but lost two points because of extending one of their lifts. Drobiazko / Vanagas finished sixth in the free, followed by Chait / Sakhnovski, skating to the classic dance music Bolero. Fusar-Poli / Margaglio finished eighth in the free with a solid program, but the most memorable moment of their skate was at the end, when Fusar-Poli fell to her knees in tears, forgiving her partner for the fall in the OD.

Results

Compulsory dance

Original dance

Free dance

Final standings

 WD = Withdrawn

Referee:
 Janet Colton

Technical Controller:
 Olga Gilardini

Technical Specialist:
 Andrzej Dostatni

Assistant Technical Specialist:
 Marie Bowness

Judges (CD):
 Alla Shekhovtseva
 John Greenwood
 Rolf Pipoh
 Walter Zuccaro
 Evgenia Karnolska
 Katalin Alpern
 Mayumi Kato
 Linda Leaver
 Odette Coulson
 Christine Hurth
 Anastassia Makarova
 Akos Pethes

Judges (OD):
 Evgenia Karnolska
 Walter Zuccaro
 Rolf Pipoh
 Alla Shekhovtseva
 John Greenwood
 Christine Hurth
 Linda Leaver
 Odette Coulson
 Akos Pethes
 Mayumi Kato
 Anastassia Makarova
 Katalin Alpern

Judges (FD):
 Alla Shekhovtseva
 John Greenwood
 Katalin Alpern
 Evgenia Karnolska
 Walter Zuccaro
 Odette Coulson
 Akos Pethes
 Mayumi Kato
 Linda Leaver
 Rolf Pipoh
 Christine Hurth
 Anastassia Makarova

References

External links
 
 Dance Protocol

Ice dance
2006 in figure skating
2006
Mixed events at the 2006 Winter Olympics